Yukihiko is a masculine Japanese given name.

Possible writings
Yukihiko can be written using different combinations of kanji characters. Here are some examples: 

幸彦, "happiness, elegant boy"
幸比古, "happiness, young man (archaic)" 
行彦, "to go, elegant boy"
行比古, "to go,  young man (archaic)"
之彦, "of, elegant boy"
志彦, "determination,  elegant boy"
雪彦, "snow, elegant boy"
恭彦, "respectful, elegant boy"
由起彦, "reason, to rise, elegant boy"
由紀彦, "reason, chronicle, elegant boy"
有紀彦, "to have, chronicle, elegant boy"

The name can also be written in hiragana ゆきひこ or katakana ユキヒコ.

Notable people with the name

, Japanese politician
, Japanese composer and musician
, Japanese politician
, Japanese general
, Japanese footballer
, Japanese television and film director
, Japanese handball player
, Japanese automotive engineer
, pseudonym of Shinzaburō Yasuda, Japanese painter

Japanese masculine given names